Winter Street in Boston, Massachusetts is located between Tremont Street and Washington Street, near the Common. It is currently a pedestrian zone. Prior to 1708, it was called Blott's Lane and then Bannister's Lane..  It was also known at times as "Winer Street."

See also
 Downtown Crossing
 Boston Music Hall
Former tenants
 M.M. Ballou, publisher
 Deloss Barnum, photographer
 Central Church
 Walter Lofthouse Dean, 3 Winter Street, painter
 Draper & Folsom, publishers
 Fadettes of Boston
 Gilchrist's store
 A.N. Hardy, photographer
 Josiah Leavitt
 New England Emigrant Aid Company
 Polyanthos
 Henry and John Christian Rauschner, portraitists
 Schoenhof & Moeller
 S.R. Urbino, foreign books

References

Image gallery

Streets in Boston
History of Boston
Financial District, Boston